This is a list of the gymnasts who represented their country at the 1960 Summer Olympics in Rome from 25 August to 11 September 1960. Only one discipline, artistic gymnastics, was included in the Games.

Female artistic gymnasts

Male artistic gymnasts

References 

Lists of gymnasts
Gymnastics at the 1960 Summer Olympics